Lego Island is a Lego-themed open world action-adventure game developed and published by Mindscape. It was released for Microsoft Windows on September 26, 1997, as the second Lego video game overall and the first one outside Japan. In the "proto-open world" game, players explore the eponymous island as one of five unique minifigure characters—each one modeled after an intelligence type according to the theory of multiple intelligences—to build vehicles and complete side quests; the game's main story involves Pepper Roni, a pizza delivery boy, and his efforts to stop an escaped prisoner known as the Brickster from destroying the island.

Lego Island received generally positive reviews from critics. It was a commercial success, selling close to one million copies by 1999. The game was followed by two sequels, both developed by Silicon Dreams Studio: Lego Island 2: The Brickster's Revenge (2001) and Island Xtreme Stunts (2002). It has since gained a cult following, with a fan-made sequel in development .

Gameplay 

Lego Island is a nonlinear video game played from a first-person perspective. Set on the eponymous Lego Island, the player can choose to roam around and customize the island, build vehicles with the help of auto mechanic Bill Ding, or complete a series of missions including pizza delivery, jet ski racing, and catching an escaped prisoner known as the Brickster.

It features five playable characters: police officers Laura and Nick Brick, pizzeria proprietors Mama and Papa Brickolini, and their adopted son Pepper Roni, a pizza delivery boy who serves as the protagonist. Each character possesses their own unique abilities and interactions modeled after different intelligence types; the game showcases two additional intelligence types via non-player characters in the Brickster and the Infomaniac, the latter of which serves as the island's tour guide. The game also includes numerous Easter eggs spread across the island.

Plot 

While there is no necessary objective to Lego Island, a special mission will occur if the player has built the police helicopter (the player must go to the police station to do that) and is playing as Pepper Roni. Pepper's caretakers, Mama and Papa Brickolini, who run and own the Pizzeria, receive a call from the island's jail. Mistaking the caller for police officer Nick Brick, Pepper is sent to deliver a pizza to the jail, which allows the Brickster (who reveals that he was the one who somehow made the phone call pretending to be Nick) to escape from his cell by using the pizza's fumes to melt the lock. He escapes in the police helicopter and steals the power brick from the top of the Information Center before flying away. If the helicopter is not built, the Brickster will not be able to escape and will reject the pizza. Once the Brickster escapes, Nick and Laura Brick, the Infomaniac, and Papa and Mama Brickolini discover what happened and Mama explains that she heard the helicopter head to the residential area. Nick recalls that during his last escape, he was using a cave near the residential area as a hideout. They decide to have Pepper help recapture the Brickster with the help of his skateboard. Pepper then embarks on a mission to recapture him. 

Pepper travels his way across the island, encountering citizens panicking about the Brickster's escape in the process. After Pepper reaches the residential area, he discovers that the Brickster has blocked two of the entrances. He enters through the only available entrance where he meets up with Nick and Laura, who had removed the barricades at the other two entrances. They encounter the Brickster, who has stolen the ambulance from the hospital. A police officer contacts Nick and Laura through the radio about the ambulance's theft and that the Brickster is planning to disassemble the town with a laser gun powered by the stolen power brick. After Nick and Laura obtain a brick that the Brickster left behind and take back to the police station's lab for analysis, Pepper chases after the Brickster alone, collecting individual brick pieces that the Brickster drops while he stops in random areas to disassemble any buildings and plants that are nearby. Should Pepper catch up to the Brickster while he is doing this, he will quickly move. After obtaining five pieces, the Brickster quickly heads for the cave entrance where he drops one more piece and disappears into the cave (should the player go into the cave afterward, he is nowhere to be seen). After the Brickster has gone into hiding, Nick and Laura deduct that the six pieces that Pepper collected are parts of the helicopter that the Brickster had taken apart, but four pieces are still missing; they have been hidden around the island by the Brickster. Pepper then searches around the island for the remaining four pieces. Any of the previous six helicopter pieces that Pepper didn't collect earlier can still be picked up. Once all ten pieces are recovered, the Infomaniac sends Pepper to the police station to rebuild the helicopter, having also come up with a plan to capture the Brickster. Alternatively, if the pizzeria, Information Center, and police station are the only remaining buildings and the previous five pieces are not collected in the meantime, the Brickster will instead dissemble the Pizzeria and the player immediately skips to the part where they must rebuild the helicopter. Once the helicopter is rebuilt, the Infomaniac, Nick, and Laura advise Pepper to use it to help them catch the Brickster by firing pizzas and donuts using an invention called the Pizza Turbo Chucker (which is not seen onscreen), using the pizzas to slow the Brickster down and the donuts to speed up Nick and Laura before the Brickster, now driving a stolen police motorcycle (it is unknown what happened to the ambulance, but it can be assembled that it was recovered), can disassemble the remaining buildings.

Two different endings can occur, depending on whether the player succeeds or not. If all the buildings have been disassembled (except for the Information Center), it will trigger the ending that shows the Brickster standing on the power brick, gloating about his victory with pieces of buildings scattered all around him, the citizens of Lego Island left crying, and "Requiem over Spilt Beer" by Polkacide playing in the background. However, the Infomaniac then reassures the player that they can rebuild the island and the Brickster will be returned to his cell. The other ending unlocks if the Brickster is reached by the police, leading to the Brickster being caught and thrown back in jail, the power brick returning at the top of the Information Center, and everyone celebrating Pepper's success. The Infomaniac thanks the player, who is once again free to roam around the island.

Mini-Missions 
Besides the special mission, there are also other minor missions that the player can do anytime and playing as any character:
 Jet-Ski Race: The player must go to the beach, build the Jet-Ski, and touch the buoy out in the water, which will transport them to the race course, where they compete with two other racers. The Infomaniac will reward the player with a brick depending what place they came in: red for first place, blue for second place, and yellow for third place.
 Car Race: The player must first go to the racetrack and build the race car to compete in the race against two other racers within an underground course. Like the Jet-Ski Race, the Informaniac will reward the player with either a red, blue, or yellow brick depending on what place they came in.
 Pizza Delivery Mission: Depending on which character the player is playing as, Mama, Papa, or Pepper will tell the player where to deliver the pizza to: the race track, the police station, the jail (which will trigger the special mission), the gas station, or the hospital. The player must click on the pizza to accept the mission and then using Pepper's skateboard to make their way through obstacles and reach the destination.
 Hospital Mission: The doctor has received two emergencies at the police station and the pizzeria, but most of his staff aren't available so he has the player help and sends his employees Enter and Return to help them. To start the mission, the player should click on the hat that the doctor lends them and they will then watch Enter and Return load the ambulance with the stretcher, a loudspeaker, a shark, a tree, an umbrella, and a mailbag. The player must drive the ambulance to both locations. At the pizzeria, Pepper and a man will inform them of a choking man in the pizzeria with Papa. The player must click on the man, making him spit out a shark, who will then spit out a dog, who will then spit out a cat, who will then spit out a parrot. Enter and Return then load the man and the four animals onto the ambulance. If the player is playing as Pepper, then he won't be there and if the player is playing as Papa, then Mama will be in the pizzeria instead. At the police station, a man is stuck on the roof and the player must click on the red and white gate to open it and allow Enter and Return to use the stretcher to catch the man after he falls and then load him onto the ambulance. Once both tasks are finished, the player returns to the hospital to complete the mission. Once back, the doctor will thank the player for their help as Enter and Return take the patients into the hospital while the ambulance goes behind it.
 Tow Truck Mission: At the gas station, the player can find Nubby and Nancy. When Nancy learns of an accident at the race track, Nubby is unable to go and asks the player to go instead. Nubby will lend the player a hat that they must click on to start the mission. Once the player drives the tow truck to the race track, two technicians take the tow truck to the track and attach a broken red race car to the truck's hook before bringing it back to the player, who must then drive it back to the gas station to finish the mission. Nubby will then thank the player for their help. The player can also build the Dune Buggy at the gas station.

Development and release 
Lego Island was developed by Mindscape, a developer of edutainment software based in Novato, California. The head of one of the company's departments was looking for a partner company in the toy industry and, after some research, settled for the Lego Group, the producer of the Lego line of toys. Mindscape subsequently hired Wes Jenkins, who, in turn, brought on Paul Melmed. Jenkins and Melmed drafted a game concept based on the "Town" theme of Lego sets. Both attended the Toy Fair in New York City in February 1995, pitching the concept to the Lego Group.

Around the same time, the Lego Group (as well as other toy manufacturers) were trying to explore or gain a foothold in the video game industry. The previously only Lego-branded video game was Lego Fun to Build, which was released by Sega in December 1995 for the Japanese Sega Pico market. The Lego Group had established the Futura research and development group in Boston, which was looking at possible intersections between Lego products and digital media, including video games and virtual reality experiences. In 1995, the Lego Group employee Tormod Askildsen was tasked with exploring the company's potential venture into the video game market. He hired a handful of people and prepared a report, titled "Elvis", which he presented during a workshop on December 21, 1995. The report stated that the Lego Group's entrance into the video game market was a necessity, rather than an option. Mindscape and the Lego Group jointly announced their collaboration for a Lego-branded personal computer game on January 27, 1996, then targeting to release the game in the fourth quarter of that year.

Jenkins headed the project as its creative director, while Melmed acted as the education and research director. Other leads included senior producer Scott Anderson, director of development Dennis Goodrow, project manager Mari Collings, and the lead 3D artist Dave Patch. The lead programmer, Jim Brown, was hired at Anderson's request. The development team eventually grew to more than 100 people, which allowed for the inclusion of multiple playable characters. As proposed by Melmed, who had a background in psychology, each of these characters would represent a different form of intelligence as described by Howard Gardner's theory of multiple intelligences.

The development team created a bespoke game engine, which was to be used for Lego Island and potential sequels. The DirectX technology set was used to render 3D environments. According to Brown, graphics accelerators were in their infancy, so Lego Island was designed to work on computers that did not have one, while simultaneously being able to take advantage of an accelerator if one was available. Jenkins, his wife Kyle, and Anderson created a real-world model of the game's island, and the development team invited children to play with the set, observing how these children would interact with the various elements. According to Anderson, girls tended to decorate the island, such as with trees, while boys were more interested in racing elements. Subsequently, more of the game's elements, including the sky and trees, were made customizable with the goal of incentivizing girls to play the game. In so-called "Yes meetings", team members could present any further ideas they had to the rest of the team. If another member agreed, the proposer would sleep over it and, on the next day, try to frame a realistic implementation of the feature.

During 1996, the Lego Group established Lego Media as its video game division based in London, invested  in the development of Lego-themed video games, and created Darwin, a "Strategic Product Unit" that absorbed most of Futura. Mindscape regularly communicated with Lego Media and Darwin, which led to the inclusion of further buildings and vehicles in the game, as well as the exclusion of non-Lego elements like ropes. In January 1997, Mindscape and the Lego Group reintroduced the game, now titled Adventures on Lego Island and scheduled for a release in the third quarter of 1997. As Lego Island, the game was released worldwide on September 26, 1997. One day prior to the release, Mindscape fired the entirety of Lego Islands development team. The company had a program for bonuses in place, so several of the affected employees believed that Mindscape laid them off solely to avoid paying royalties. Jenkins died on September 24, 2017.

Reception 
In a contemporary retrospective of another Lego-based edutainment game, Kotaku Australias Zack Zwiezen noted that edutainment titles in general (including Lego Island) were rarely reviewed by video game critics upon release due to the young target demographic. Despite that, the game received mainly positive reception among critics from newspapers; Gary Duchane of the Hartford Courant praised the game's graphics and animations while appreciating the multiple player characters and side quests. The Windsor Stars Paul Dame was dismayed with the restricted building options in the game, though he recommended it to "children who love Lego." Writing for Tribune Media Services, Pam Gleichman commented that the game was widely acclaimed by boys while receiving more mixed reception among girls after they tested it out. Minor criticism was leveled at the game's system requirements; Aaron Curtiss of the Los Angeles Times complained that the game was "an absolute resource hog, pushing most home desktops to the limit—even in low-resolution mode." Duchane concurred, noting that he attempted to load the game on computers with Pentium processors clocked at 90, 133, and 200 MHz, and found that the game "only ran happily on the 200."

Lego Island won the Academy of Interactive Arts & Sciences' 1997 "Family/Kids Entertainment Title of the Year" award. In 2016, Sam Loveridge of Digital Spy ranked Lego Island as the 14th best Lego game in a list of 15.

In the United States, Lego Island sold over 909,000 copies between 1997 and 1999, making it the 15th-best-selling computer game of that period. It was the country's 11th-best-selling computer game in 1997, with 323,085 units sold and almost  earned in revenue. It reached eighth place on the United States' chart for the January–November 1998 period. It ultimately placed seventh for the full year of 1998, with 404,858 sales. The following year, it dropped to the 15th position on the annual sales charts, with 309,698 units sold. The success of Lego Island revived Mindscape's business, which was in trouble at the time. The company's total sales rose by 70% in 1997, driven primarily by Lego Island.

Legacy 
In partnering with the Lego Group, Mindscape had gained the rights to produce multiple Lego-branded games. Prior to the Lego Island developers' dismissal, they had been conceptualizing and prototyping a follow-up to the game, titled Beneath the Phanta Sea. This follow-up would have explored the "importance of ecology and environmentalism from an educational perspective". However, after the release of Lego Island, the Lego Group terminated Mindscape's license for future Lego-based games. Silicon Dreams Studio eventually developed two sequels: Lego Island 2: The Brickster's Revenge (2001) and Island Xtreme Stunts (2002). During the development of the prior, the studio was aware of the original Lego Island and Beneath the Phanta Sea but decided to build a new concept from scratch. Island Xtreme Stunts became the final entry in the Lego Island series.

Lego Island has inspired a number of preservationists and other enthusiasts. Among other things, fans of the game have created documentaries with archives of old production material, produced podcasts, and developed unofficial patches. A fan-made sequel, Project Island, was initiated as a solo project by Floris Thoonen in the mid-2010s. The game was formally announced around Lego Islands twentieth anniversary in 2017. As of 2020, around 50 people are working on Project Island with varying degrees of activeness, with all of them contributing during their spare time. The project team irregularly publishes update videos and intends to release a demo entitled Port Pizza, featuring a small island with a limited scope.

References

Bibliography 

 

1997 video games
Action-adventure games
Helicopter video games
Interactive Achievement Award winners
Island
Minigame compilations
Open-world video games
Video games about police officers
Video games developed in the United States
Video games featuring female protagonists
Video games set on fictional islands
Windows games
Windows-only games
Mindscape games
D.I.C.E. Award for Family Game of the Year winners